The Rome at War series is Avalanche Press' Board wargame series covering ancient land combat.  The series started in 2000 with the release of Hannibal at Bay.

Games

Hannibal at Bay
Hannibal at Bay is the first game in the series and was released in 2000.  The game covers the Punic Wars between Rome and Carthage.  The original version of the game used hard mounted game boards, which increased the selling price of the game.  An updated version of Hannibal at Bay was announced on May 13, 2008 and was scheduled to be released in June 2008.  This game will use cardstock game boards (like those in the Panzer Grenadier series) to reduce the price of the game.  This version game is designed to be an entry point for the series, just like Airborne is for Panzer Grenadier.

Fading Legions
Fading Legions was released in 2002 and moved the series to the end of the Roman Empire, with battles against the Sassanid Persians and other enemies.

Queen of the Celts
The series did not receive any updates until 2007, with Queen of the Celts.  This game covers both the Roman invasion of Britain and the resistance led by Caratacus, and the revolt of Boudicca against Roman misrule.  The game is named after Boudica.

King of Kings
King of Kings is the first book supplement to Rome at War and was announced on September 15, 2008.  It covers the conflicts between the Roman Empire and the northern barbarians, as well as conflicts involving the Sassanid Empire, Palmyra, and Armenia.

Future Games
Future games in the Rome at War include one on Julius Caesar, and an updated version of Hannibal at Bay.

References

External links
Avalanche Press' Hannibal at Bay webpage
Avalanche Press' Fading Legions webpage
Avalanche Press' Queen of the Celts webpage

Avalanche Press games
Board games about history
Board wargames set in Ancient history
Cultural depictions of Boudica
Cultural depictions of Hannibal
Wargames introduced in the 2000s